The 1937–38 season was the 39th season for FC Barcelona.

Results 

 The second round match against Manresa was not disputed withdraw from the competition.

External links

webdelcule.com
webdelcule.com

References

FC Barcelona seasons
Barcelona